Alan Fairbairn (25 January 1923 – 7 March 2005) was an English cricketer. 

Born in Winchmore Hill, Middlesex, he played club cricket for Southgate and also first-class cricket for Middlesex. He played in 21 matches as a left-handed batsman (1947–1951). 

Fairbairn was awarded his county cap in 1947 when he was a member of the Middlesex team that won the County Championship. He scored 776 runs in first-class cricket with a highest score of 110 not out, one of two centuries.

He died in Enfield, Middlesex on 7 March 2005 aged 82.

Notes

Sources
 Alan Fairbairn at CricketArchive
 Playfair Cricket Annual – 1948 edition

Middlesex cricketers
English cricketers
Marylebone Cricket Club cricketers
1923 births
2005 deaths